Overload is the debut album by the Pakistani rock band Overload, released in 2006. Singles from their debut album were "Cursed", "Storm" and "Dhamaal".

Dhamaal was nominated for the Best Video Award at the Lux Style Awards 2008.

Track listing
All music arranged & composed by Sheraz Siddiq, Farhad Humayun and Hassan Mohyeddin.

Personnel
Overload
Farhad Humayun - drums
Sheraz Siddiq - keyboards
Hassan Mohyeddin - percussions
Pappu Sain - dhol
Jhura Sain - dhol

Additional musicians
 Vocals on "Mahiya Ve" by Shafqat Amanat Ali
 Guitars on "Wearing Out" by Assad Jamil
 Nakara played by Mureed Hussain

Production
Produced by Farhad Humayun 
Co - Produced by Sarmad Ghafoor
Recorded & Mixed at Riot Studios, Lahore, Punjab

References

External links
Official Website

2006 debut albums
Overload (Pakistani band) albums
Urdu-language albums